Derrek Chan (born August 8, 1998) is an American soccer player who currently plays as a goalkeeper.

Career

Youth
Chan played high school soccer at Orange Lutheran High School, where he was a three-time team defensive MVP and earned All-Trinity League honors in his final prep season. Chan also played club soccer for various teams in California, including West Coast FC, who he helped to titles at the National Cup, the Surf Cup Super Cup, and the Vegas Cup, as well as a SCDCL Flight One title. Chan also competed for the CalSouth ODP, LA Galaxy Academy, Strikers FC Academy, and FC Golden State Academy teams.

College & Amateur
In 2017, Chan attended the University of California, Davis to play college soccer. Chan made 16 appearances for the Aggies, 15 of those in his final season in 2021, where he recorded 45 saves, and tallied four shutouts.

While at college, Chan also appeared in the USL PDL for Orange County SC U23 in 2018, making a single appearance.

Professional
On March 3, 2022, Chan signed with USL Championship club New York Red Bulls II. He made his professional debut on April 2, 2022, coming on as a 2nd–minute substitute in a 3–2 loss to FC Tulsa following a sending off to starting goalkeeper Giannis Nikopolidis. On May 11, 2022, New York announced that Chan had been loaned to Rochester New York FC for their U.S. Open Cup match against New York City FC. The Red Bulls recalled Chan immediately after the game. Chan made his first professional start for New York Red Bulls II on May 21, 2022 during a 2-0 loss to Indy Eleven.

On June 10, 2022, Chan joined USL League One side Charlotte Independence on a short-term loan deal. He started for the Independence the following day in a 4–0 loss to Richmond Kickers.

References

External links

1998 births
Living people
American soccer players
Association football goalkeepers
Charlotte Independence players
College men's soccer players in the United States
New York Red Bulls II players
Orange County SC U-23 players
Rochester New York FC players
Soccer players from California
UC Davis Aggies men's soccer players
USL Championship players
USL League Two players